Signal peptide peptidase 3, also known as UNQ1887, is a human gene.

References

Further reading